Fifty-Fifty may refer to:

Arts and entertainment

Theatre
 Fifty-Fifty (play), a 1932 play by H. F. Maltby

Film
 Fifty-Fifty (1916 film), an American silent drama directed by Allan Dwan
 Fifty-Fifty (1925 film), an American silent drama directed by Henri Diamant-Berger
 Fifty-Fifty (1971 film), an Israeli comedy directed by Boaz Davidson
 , a Soviet spy drama directed by Aleksandr Faintsimmer
 Fiffty Fiffty, a 1981 Indian drama, directed by Shomu Mukherjee
 50/50 (1982 film), a Norwegian film directed by Oddvar Bull Tuhus
 Fifty/Fifty (1992 film), an American thriller; directed by and co-starring Charles Martin Smith
 Fifty-Fifty (2004 film), a Russian-language Kazakh drama, directed by Gulshat Omarova
 50/50 (2011 film), an American comedy-drama written by Will Reiser; directed by Jonathan Levine
 Zindagi 50-50, a 2013 Indian film
 50/50 (2016 film), a documentary on "the 10,000 year history of women and power"
 50/50 (2019 film), an Indian film

Television
 50/50 (South African TV program), a South African environmental television program that has aired since 1987
 50/50 (British game show), a British children's game show programme that aired from April 1997 to July 2005 on BBC One
 50–50 (game show), an international game show that is effectively a version of the game show Who Wants to Be a Millionaire?
 50-50 (series), the English name for the Greek television series Peninta Peninta
 Fifty Fifty (Pakistani TV series), a 1980s Pakistani television comedy series loosely based on the United States' Saturday Night Live TV series
 Fifty-Fifty (Greek TV series), also known as Peninta Peninta, a 2005 Greek comedy television series that was revived in 2011
 "Fifty–Fifty" (The 4400), an episode of The 4400
 Partners in Crime (U.S. TV series), renamed in the UK as Fifty/Fifty
 50:50, a "lifeline" in the Who Wants to Be a Millionaire? franchise

Music
 "Fifty-Fifty" (song), a 1997 hindi song by Indian pop singers Shaan and Sagarika
 "Fifty-Fifty" (rock song), a 1973 rock song by Frank Zappa, on the album Over-Nite Sensation
 "50/50" (song), a 1987 song by Miho Nakayama
 "50/50 Luv", a 1995 single by American rappers B.G. Knocc Out & Dresta
 "50/50 & Lullaby", a 2003 single by R&B singer Lemar
 50% & 50%, a 1993 single by Japanese musician hide
 50/50 (Dima Bilan album) (2011), renamed Mechtatel before its release
 50 for 50, a 2017 Jethro Tull boxed set
 50:50@50, a 2017 album by British folk rock band Fairport Convention
 Fifty Fifty (group), a South Korean girl group

Food and drink
 50/50 burger, a burger made of half ground bacon, half ground beef
 50/50 (soft drink), a grapefruit-and-lime-flavored beverage
 FiftyFifty Brewing Company, a brewpub

Other uses
 5050 (number)
 Fifty-fifty, an association football term for a type of challenge
 50/50 raffle, a type of cash drawing
 50/50 valve seat, a type of ball valve
 50–50, rocket propellant community jargon for Aerozine 50

See also

 50-50 club (disambiguation)
 5050 (disambiguation)
 50 (disambiguation)